Sautron is a commune in the Loire-Atlantique département in western France.

Geography

Sautron is located 10 km north west of Nantes, close to the Nantes-Vannes expressway.

Surrounding communes are Vigneux-de-Bretagne, Orvault, Saint-Herblain and Couëron.

According to the classification established by INSEE, Sautron is a commune urbaine (urban commune), one of 22 communes in the suburban area of Nantes.

Population

Sites and monuments

See also
Communes of the Loire-Atlantique department

References

External links
 Website of the Commune of Sautron

Communes of Loire-Atlantique